Petja Turunen (born 19 November 1980), known professionally as MC Raaka Pee, is a Finnish metal musician and the co-founder and vocalist of Turmion Kätilöt. He plays the piano and guitar as well. He owns the record label OSASTO-A.

Raaka Pee has a side project named 2 Times Terror which released their debut album in 2010. Raaka Pee is also playing guitar in the music video and debut album for 2 Times Terror.

As Raaka Pee, he has sung backing vocals in Tarot's album Crows Fly Black. and has been a DJ as well as folk and humppa musician. Raaka Pee also did parts of the keyboards for Project Silence's 2010 released song Stardancer (Raven's whore). He also has sung backing vocals for Black Light Discipline and performed shows with them. He has done remixes for Ruoska, Blood and Fear of Domination.

On 7 December 2012, Turunen suffered a serious stroke.

Remixes 
Blood – Gotika [MC Raaka Pee Remix]
Ruoska – Irti [MC Raaka Pee Remix]
Ruoska – Kosketa [MC Raaka Pee "Päätä Seinään" Remix]
Fear of Domination – Fear Of Domination [MC Raaka Pee Remix]
Pain – Dirty Woman [MC Raaka Pee Remix]
Rainbowcrash – Zeitgeist [MC Raaka Pee Remix]

References

External links 

 Turmion Kätilöt home page

1980 births
Living people
People from Siilinjärvi
Finnish heavy metal musicians